Valvata sibirica is a species of minute freshwater snail with an operculum, an aquatic gastropod mollusk in the family Valvatidae, the valve snails.

Distribution
This species occurs in Russia.

Habitat
This snail lives in freshwater habitats.

References

External links 
 Valvata sibirica at AnimalBase

Valvatidae
Gastropods described in 1851
Taxa named by Alexander von Middendorff